Various musical artists have recorded covers of one or more songs written and recorded by American singer and songwriter Madonna. Many began covering her songs since her debut in the 1980s. These covers are in several different languages and genres, and some have received positive reviews from music critics and featured on record charts.

In regards being a source of numerous covers, Mayer Nissim of Digital Spy stated that "her influence has spread like a spider web into the wider (and weirder) world of music". Similarly, Guinness World Records listed Madonna as the most remixed and sampled act arguing that "is a testament to just how incredibly influential she is". With covers from Glee: The Music, The Power of Madonna entering into Billboard charts in 2012, Gary Trust from the magazine said that "Madonna's songs have found a place atop a Billboard ranking even when she's not singing them", adding also that this reinforce that her music "continues to reign among each new generation".

A subject of diverse listicles, media outlets such as Paste, StyleCaster, Rolling Stone, Digital Spy and Stereogum among others have created best-of lists covers of Madonna songs. Writing for The Guardian, Peter Robinson noticed several covers made by male musicians, including Marilyn Manson, Marc Almond, KMFDM and Teenage Fanclub. One of the most commercially releases, is the version of "Like a Prayer" by Mad'House, which marked the debut of the band and sold 2 million copies throughout Europe according to Dutch agent Jan Vis; in France alone, Charts in France reported sales of 326,000 copies as of 2014. Similarly, singers Kelly Osbourne ("Papa Don't Preach") and Cristina Scuccia ("Like a Virgin") made their musical debut covering a Madonna song. In 2023, the staff of Rolling Stone placed Miley Cyrus's redention of "Like a Prayer" among her best 50 songs.

Key

Selected list

Charted cover songs

See also
List of Madonna tribute albums
Dancemania Speed 6

Notes

Sources

Book sources

External links

Covers of Madonna songs and/or songs covered by Madonna on WhoSampled

Madonna